The Durango Kid is a 1940 American Western directed by Lambert Hillyer, starring Charles Starrett, Luana Walters and Kenneth McDonald. This is the first of 65 Durango Kid movies Starrett made at Columbia Pictures.

Plot summary
 In this timeless classic western film the protagonist Durango kid (Charles Starrett) stands off against Sam Lowry (Frank LaRue) for the hand of Nancy Winslow (Luana Walters)

Cast
 Charles Starrett as Bill Lowry / The Durango Kid  
 Luana Walters as Nancy Winslow  
 Kenneth MacDonald as Mace Ballard  
 Francis Walker as Henchman Steve  
 Forrest Taylor as Ben Winslow  
 Melvin Lang as Marshal Dan Trayboe  
 Bob Nolan as Bob - Member of Sons of the Pioneers  
 Pat Brady as Pat - Member of Sons of the Pioneers  
 Frank LaRue as Sam Lowry  
 Sons of the Pioneers as Ranch Hands and Musicians

Notes
Columbia and  Starrett also made The Return of the Durango Kid (1945), Landrush (1946), Quick on the Trigger (1948), Laramie (1949), Renegades of the Sage (1949), Horsemen of the Sierras (1949), Streets of Ghost Town (1950), Texas Dynamo (1950), Lightning Guns (1950), Frontier Outpost (1950), Raiders of Tomahawk Creek (1950), Across the Badlands (1950), and Junction City (1952).

References

External links
 
 

American Western (genre) films
1940 Western (genre) films
1940 films
Films directed by Lambert Hillyer
Columbia Pictures films
American black-and-white films
1940s American films